Agathidium akrogeneios is a species of round fungus beetle in the family Leiodidae. It is found in North America. This species is similar to other A. dentigerum subgroup members that have a large, acute, falcate male metafemoral tooth, very narrow metasternum with the oblique metasternal carinae relatively prominent and meeting medially in a large, posteriorly directed triangular lobe, large male metasternal fovea, and reduced eyes.

References 

Beetles described in 2005